Duplessis is an unincorporated community located in Ascension Parish, Louisiana, United States, which is located north of Gonzales.

References

Unincorporated communities in Ascension Parish, Louisiana
Baton Rouge metropolitan area
Unincorporated communities in Louisiana